Björn Nordin is a Swedish orienteering competitor. He received a silver medal in the relay event at the 1970 World Orienteering Championships in Friedrichroda, together with Karl Johansson, Sture Björk and Bernt Frilén.

References

Year of birth missing (living people)
Living people
Swedish orienteers
Male orienteers
Foot orienteers
World Orienteering Championships medalists
20th-century Swedish people